Aratani Dam is a gravity dam located in Yamaguchi prefecture in Japan. The dam is used for flood control and water supply. The catchment area of the dam is 8.1 km2. The dam impounds about 25  ha of land when full and can store 5200 thousand cubic meters of water. The construction of the dam was started on 1976 and completed in 1987.

References

Dams in Yamaguchi Prefecture
1987 establishments in Japan